Luis Rivera may refer to:

Luis Rivera (athlete) (born 1987), Mexican long jumper
Luis Rivera (gymnast) (born 1986), Puerto Rican gymnast
Luis Rivera (infielder) (born 1964), former player and a coach in Major League Baseball
Luis Rivera (pitcher) (born 1978), MLB pitcher
Luis Antonio Rivera (born 1930), Puerto Rican comedian
Luis Collazo Rivera, Puerto Rican politician, former mayor of Toa Alta
Luis Daniel Rivera, Puerto Rican politician, former member of the Puerto Rican senate
Luis Guillermo Rivera (born 1975), Colombian footballer
Luis Mariano Rivera (1906–2002), Venezuelan singer, composer, poet and dramatist
Luis Muñoz Rivera (1859–1916), Puerto Rican politician or the park named after him
Luis Padrón Rivera (1892–1960), Puerto Rican politician
Ramón Luis Rivera (born c. 1925), former mayor of the city of Bayamón
Luis Rivera (actor), actor whose films include I'll Kill Him and Return Alone (1967)

See also 
 Luis (disambiguation)
 Rivera (disambiguation)